Christian Abraham Sorensen (March 24, 1890 – August 25, 1959) was an American lawyer and politician.

Sorensen was born in Harrisburg, Nebraska. Sorensen graduated from Loup City High School in Loup City, Nebraska in 1909. He went to Grand Island Baptist College in Grand Island, Nebraska from 1909 to 1912. Sorensen received his bachelor's and law degrees from University of Nebraska in 1913 and 1916. Sorensen served as the Nebraska Attorney General from 1929 to 1933 and was a Republican. Sorensen lived in Lincoln, Nebraska with his wife Annis (Chalkin) and his sons Philip C. Sorensen and Ted Sorensen. Sorensen and his wife also had one daughter and two other sons. He was also a co-writer with Myrtle Keegan, in 1917, on a book about legislative procedures in the Nebraska Legislature. He practiced law in Lincoln, Nebraska. Sorensen died in Lincoln, Nebraska.

Notes

1890 births
1959 deaths
People from Banner County, Nebraska
Politicians from Lincoln, Nebraska
University of Nebraska alumni
Nebraska lawyers
Nebraska Attorneys General
Nebraska Republicans
Writers from Lincoln, Nebraska
20th-century American lawyers